Alix Madigan is an American film producer known for her work on the 2010 film Winter's Bone, for which she was nominated for an Academy Award.

Career
Madigan's first production credit was for Sunday in 1997, which won the Sundance Film Festival Grand Jury prize for Best Film.

For her work on the 2010 film, Winter's Bone, Madigan, with co-producer Anne Rosellini and director Debra Granik, received the Gotham Award for Best Feature. The film also earned her nominations for the Academy Award for Best Picture.

In 2018, In 2018, Alix Madigan produced the Lebanese film 1982 alongside Oualid Mouaness, Myriam Sassine, Georges Schoucair and Christopher Tricarico. The film was Lebanon's 2019 submission to the Academy Awards. The film also won the NETPAC Award for World or International Asian Film Premiere at the Toronto Film Festival.

Madigan has worked with Anonymous Content, Propaganda Films, Skouras Pictures, and Avenue Entertainment. She now runs her own independent production company entitled Mad Dog Films.

Background
Alix Madigan was born and raised in New York City. She graduated from Dartmouth College and Wharton School of the University of Pennsylvania, and received her masters in business at the latter. She is married to David Yorkin, with whom she has two children. They live in California.

Filmography
Sunday (1997) - producer
Your Friends & Neighbors (1998) - executive producer
Smiley Face (2007) - producer
Cleaner (2007) - producer
Married Life (2007) - executive producer
Case 39 (2009) - co-producer
Winter's Bone (2010) - producer
Girl Most Likely (2012) - producer
May in the Summer (2013) - producer
Laggies (2014) - producer
White Bird in a Blizzard (2014) - producer
The Automatic Hate (2015) - producer
The Age of Adaline (2015) - executive producer
It Happened in L.A. (2017) - producer
All I Wish (2017) - executive producer
Spinning Man (2018) - executive producer
The Lie (2018) - producer
1982 (2019) - producer

References

External links

American film producers